Groß Godems is a municipality in the Ludwigslust-Parchim district, in Mecklenburg-Vorpommern, Germany.

Notable people
Carl Abs (1851–1895), professional wrestler

References

Ludwigslust-Parchim
Grand Duchy of Mecklenburg-Schwerin